The Arts Institute (formerly Peninsula Arts) operates from within the Faculty of Arts and serves as the Arts and Culture programming umbrella organisation for the University of Plymouth. The year round public programme includes exhibitions, music, film, talks and performing arts. Its aim is to provide a prestigious and wide-ranging series of events which open up the arts and university to the people of Plymouth, the South West and visitors to the region.

The University of Plymouth Contemporary Music Festival is one of its annual events, and occurs in February.

References

External links 
 The Arts Institute
 Contemporary Music Festival Website

University of Plymouth